Yek Borji (also Romanized as Yek Borjī) is a village in Qaedrahmat Rural District, Zagheh District, Khorramabad County, Lorestan Province, Iran. At the 2006 census, its population was 13 families consisting of a total of 82 individuals.

References 

Towns and villages in Khorramabad County